The Qatar Open, currently known as the Qatar ExxonMobil Open for sponsorship reasons, is a professional tennis tournament played on outdoor hard courts. It is currently part of the ATP Tour 250 series of the Association of Tennis Professionals (ATP) Tour. It is held annually in January at the Khalifa International Tennis and Squash Complex in Doha, Qatar, since 1993.

Past finals

Singles

Doubles

Records

Most singles titles: 3
 Roger Federer (2005, 2006, 2011)
Most consecutive singles titles: 2
 Stefan Edberg (1994–1995)
 Roger Federer (2005–2006)
 Andy Murray (2008–2009)
 Novak Djokovic (2016–2017)
Most singles finals: 5
 Andy Murray (2007, 2008, 2009, 2017, 2023)
Most consecutive singles finals: 3
 Andy Murray (2007–2009)Most doubles titles: 4 Rafael Nadal (2005, 2009, 2011, 2015)Most consecutive doubles titles: 2 Mark Knowles (2000, 2001)
 Martin Damm (2003, 2004)
 Cyril Suk (2003, 2004)Most doubles finals: 4'''
 Mark Knowles (1996, 2000, 2001, 2003)
 Daniel Nestor (1996, 2001, 2003, 2009)
 Rafael Nadal (2005, 2009, 2011, 2015)

Season opener
The Qatar Open has been the site of the ceremonial opening of the ATP World Tour season since 2009.  That year saw Rafael Nadal and Roger Federer (then-World No. 1 and 2, respectively) kick off the season on a tennis court situated on a boat off Doha Bay.  The following year saw the duo return, this time playing on a "magic carpet" tennis court in the Souq Waqif.  In 2011, the two came back and opened the new season on a court laid in the water of Doha Bay. The 2012 season was once again launched by both Federer and Nadal. This time, they played on a tennis court in the Katara Cultural Village amphitheatre.

See also
 List of tennis tournaments
 ATP 250 tournaments
 WTA Qatar Open

Notes

References

External links
 
 ATP tournament profile

 
Hard court tennis tournaments
Tennis tournaments in Qatar
Recurring sporting events established in 1993
ATP Tour 250
Sports competitions in Doha
Winter events in Qatar
1993 establishments in Qatar